Secondary Highway 649, commonly referred to as Highway 649, was a provincially maintained secondary highway in the Canadian province of Ontario. Now known as Kawartha Lakes Road 49, and locally as East Street North in Bobcaygeon, it is a municipally-maintained class-3 roadway (with the exception of a  class-4 section at the southern end)
located mostly along the boundary between the city of Kawartha Lakes and Peterborough County. The  route begins in Bobcaygeon at a junction with former Highway 36, and proceeds north along the boundary between Kawartha Lakes and Peterborough County to a junction with former Highway 121 just south of Kinmount.

The route was designated as Highway 500 in 1956. A major renumbering resulted in it becoming Highway 649 in 1964. The route remained generally unchanged until it was decommissioned and transferred to Victoria County at the beginning of 1998; it then became Victoria County Road 49. In 2001, Victoria County was restructured as the City of Kawartha Lakes, but the road retained the same number.

Route description 
The road crosses primarily rural geography between its southern terminus, City Road 36 (Main Street), former Highway 36, and northern terminus, City Road 121, former Highway 121. The village of Bobcaygeon at its southern terminus is an exception, and the village of Kinmount lies a short distance north of the route. The road crosses the boundary between the Ordovician limestone to the south and the granite Canadian Shield to the north, resulting in a hilly landscape with many large rock outcroppings.

History 
The road that is now Kawartha Lakes Road 49 started in 1853, when an act of parliament set forth the building of colonization roads into what was then the frontier of Upper Canada. One of the first of these roads was named the Bobcaygeon Road, after the village at its southern end.
In 1956, the southern portion of the Bobcaygeon Road through Minden was assumed by the Department of Highways (DHO), predecessor to the modern Ministry of Transportation, and numbered as Highway 500. Highway 121 was also opened along the Bobcaygeon Road that year, from south of Kinmount to Minden.

On March 1, 1964, a major renumbering took place in the Kawartha – Haliburton – Peterborough area, which resulted in Highway 500 being renumbered as Highway 649.
The road held this designation until January 1, 1998, when the entirety of Highway 649 was decommissioned and transferred to Victoria County,
which designated it as Victoria County 49.
In 2001, Victoria County was restructured as the city of Kawartha Lakes, and the road was renamed Kawartha Lakes Road 49,
which it remains known as today.

Major intersections

See also 
List of numbered roads in Kawartha Lakes, Ontario

References 

49